The New York County National Bank Building at 77–79 Eighth Avenue at West 14th Street in the Greenwich Village neighborhood of Manhattan, New York City – also known as the Manufacturers Hanover Trust Company Building – was built in 1906–07 and was designed by De Lemos & Cordes and Rudolphe L. Daus in the Neoclassical style.  A seven-story addition to the south of the building at 75 Eighth Avenue was constructed in 1926. Renovations and a further addition in 1999 were by Lee Harris of the Hudson River Studios and John Reimnitz and mimic the original architecture.

On June 7, 1988, the building was designated a New York City landmark by the New York City Landmark Preservation Commission.  It was originally designated under the name "Manufacturers Hanover Trust Company Building".

As of 2018, the building houses the Museum of Illusions.

History
The New York County National Bank was founded in 1855, and by 1877 occupied the corner lot at Eighth Avenue and 14th Street.  In 1905, it bought the lot next door at 77 Eighth Avenue from John Jacob Astor, which was occupied by a printing house.  Construction of a new bank building could not begin until the printing house's lease ran out in 1906.  The bank commissioned De Lemos and Cordes to design their new building, which was originally to have been eight stories, of which the bank would occupy two, but by the time papers were filed with the city, the building was to be one story with an attic, and De Lemos and Cordes had brought in Rudolphe L. Daus on the project.

R. H. Robertson's Neoclassical New York Savings Bank had already been erected in 1886 across 14th Street from the site, and may have been an influence in the scale and design of the new building, although classical forms were, at the time, widely used for banks throughout the United States, as "temples of commerce".  The City Beautiful movement also played a part in the choice of neoclassical design which, together with Robertson's bank, created a compatible ensemble for the intersection.

In 1921, the New York County National Bank merged with Chatham and Phenix National Bank, which then merged with Metropolitan Trust Company in 1924, forming the Chatham-Phenix National Bank and Trust Company.  This institution was bought in 1932 by Manufacturers Trust Company, which later became Manufacturers Hanover Trust Company (MHT), which continued to use the building as a branch bank. It is under this name that the building was designated a New York City landmark. In 1991, MHT merged with the Chemical Banking Corporation, which eventually became JPMorgan Chase.

Since it ceased being used as a bank, the building at 77-79 Eighth Avenue had interior alterations, and has been the location of an Off-Broadway theater, a men's gym, and a museum.

Architects
De Lemos & Cordes, the partnership of German natives Theodore W. De Lemos and August W. Cordes, was formed in 1884, and was responsible for designing a number of significant retail and commercial buildings in New York, including the Siegel-Cooper Dry Goods Store (1895); the Adams Dry Good Store (1900), executed in the Beaux-Arts style; the Macy's Department Store of 1901, an "over-scaled Renaissance style palazzo"; and the 1893 Fulton Building, in which both they and Rudolphe L. Daus had offices.  In 1903, they designed a bank building at 24 Pine Street for Speyer & Company, which received positive critical reception, and may have led to the commission to design the New York County National Bank Building.

Rudolphe L. Daus, Mexican-born and educated in New York, Berlin, and Paris, was an 1879 graduate of the École des Beaux Arts and was the recipient of a number of awards and prizes for excellence in architecture. He worked as an assistant to Richard M. Hunt before opening his own office in Brooklyn in 1884, which moved to the Flatiron Building in 1896, although his practice remained primarily in Brooklyn.  He designed both residences – in the Romanesque Revival and Queen Anne styles – and public buildings such as the Lincoln Club in 1889, the Thirteenth Regiment Armory in 1891, and a number of Brooklyn Public Library branches.

There is no record of any other collaboration between De Lemos & Cordes and Daus, although both had offices at 130 Fulton Street at the time. The plans and designs for the New York County National Bank Building are ambiguously signed, so it is not possible to who was responsible for the building's design and to what extent.

Architecture
The building has a concrete base and brick foundations. The roof is flat.  The supporting structure consists of steel columns and reinforced interior columns.  The building's facade is rubbed South Dover marble, which has in the past been painted to match the stone's original color.  The Eighth Avenue entrance has a pedimented entrance portico which has two corner piers and two fluted Ionic columns. The steps were originally flanked by two bronze lamps which have since been removed.  The pediment itself features a monumental eagle with its wings spread and its neck swooping downward, a change from the original design, in which the bird's head was to be raised.   The side facade features caduceuses, a symbol of commerce.

Gallery

References

External links

Former bank buildings
Neoclassical architecture in New York City
Commercial buildings completed in 1907
New York City Designated Landmarks in Manhattan
Bank buildings in Manhattan
14th Street (Manhattan)
Eighth Avenue (Manhattan)